The Ballinger Carnegie Library, at 204 N. 8th St. in Ballinger, Texas, is a Carnegie library which was built in 1909.  It was listed on the National Register of Historic Places in 1975.

It is built in "a vernacular version" of Classical Revival style.  Its most prominent feature is a two-story portico.

After construction of a one-story building was started, it was redesigned to add a second floor auditorium.  Additional funding from the Carnegie Foundation was sought and denied, but followups led to another check from Andrew Carnegie.

The building, in addition to serving as the library, was an important cultural center for the community. In early years it was run by members of a Shakespeare club, and was later taken over by an American Legion group.

It is a Texas State Antiquities Landmark and a Recorded Texas Historic Landmark.

References

External links

Carnegie libraries in Texas
National Register of Historic Places in Runnels County, Texas
Neoclassical architecture in Texas
Library buildings completed in 1909